NGC 50 is an elliptical galaxy in the constellation Cetus with a diameter of 170,000 light-years. It was discovered in 1865 by Gaspare Ferrari. The galaxy is, in comparison to the Milky Way, about 1.5-2 times as large. It is also physically close to NGC 49.

Other names for NGC 50 are MCG -1-1-58 and PGC 983.

See also
 List of NGC objects (1–1000)
 Elliptical galaxy

References

External links
 
 
 SEDS

0050
983
Elliptical galaxies
?
Cetus (constellation)